The 1864–65 United States Senate elections were held on various dates in various states. They occurred during the American Civil War and Abraham Lincoln's re-election. As these U.S. Senate elections were prior to the ratification of the Seventeenth Amendment in 1913, senators were chosen by state legislatures. Senators were elected over a wide range of time throughout 1864 and 1865, and a seat may have been filled months late or remained vacant due to legislative deadlock. In these elections, terms were up for the senators in Class 2.

The Republican Party gained two seats. Most of the Southern states were absent because of the Civil War.

Results summary 
Senate party division, 39th Congress (1865–1867)

 Majority party: Republican (37)
 Minority party: Democratic (9)
 Other parties: Unconditional Unionist (1); Unionist (1)
 Vacant: (24)
 Total seats: 72

Change in Senate composition

Before the elections

As a result of the elections

Beginning of the next Congress

Race summaries

Elections during the 38th Congress 
In these elections — some special and some initial — the winners were seated during 1864 or in 1865 before March 4; ordered by election date.

Elections leading to the 39th Congress 

In these regular elections, the winners were elected for the term beginning March 4, 1865; ordered by state.

All of the elections involved the Class 2 seats.

Elections during the 39th Congress 
In this election, the winner was elected in 1865 after March 4.

Maryland

Maryland (1864 special) 

James Pearce died, and Thomas Holliday Hicks was appointed to his seat. He then won election to finish the rest of the term by an unknown margin of votes, for the Class 3 seat.

Maryland (1865 special) 

Thomas Holliday Hicks died, and John Creswell was appointed to his seat. He then won election to finish the rest of the term by an unknown margin of votes, for the Class 3 seat.

West Virginia 
Incumbent Waitman T. Willey was re-elected by the legislature to his first full term as United States Senator, with Willey being elected as a Republican. Willey would serve his term until 1871.

See also
 1864 United States elections
 1864 United States presidential election
 1864–65 United States House of Representatives elections
 38th United States Congress
 39th United States Congress

Notes

References

 Party Division in the Senate, 1789-Present, via Senate.gov